Jason D. Wening is an American managing clinician and former Paralympian.

Early life and Paralympic career
Wening was born to parents John and Charlotte Wening in Jefferson City, Missouri. At the time of his birth, much of his legs below the knees were undeveloped and he was missing two fingers on his left hand. Due to his father's military career, his parents enrolled him in swimming lessons to build a support system and teach him discipline and perseverance. While attending O'Fallon Township High School, Wening was invited to the United States Disabled Sports Championships Paralympic Trials prior to the 1992 Summer Paralympics. During this time, he broke the United States Class A-3 swimming record in the 400-meter freestyle with a time of 5:19.9. Wening qualified for the team and won three gold medals and one bronze during the competition.

Wening attended Worcester Polytechnic Institute and competed in freestyle events against able-bodied swimmers before enrolling at the University of Michigan. While at Worcester, he majored in applied mathematics and competed in the 1994 IPC Swimming World Championships, winning one gold and two bronze. After winning a gold medal during the 1996 Summer Paralympics, the school proclaimed September 18, 1996 to be "Jason Wening Day." Upon graduating, Wening attended the University of Michigan for his doctoral degree in biomedical engineering.  He joined the Ann Arbor Swim Club in 1997 where he both trained and coached high school swimmers. The following year, Wening competed in the USA Swimming Disability Championships where he won the 100, 200, 400 and 1500m freestyle, while also setting world records in three events. For this achievement, he was the co-recipient of the  Phillips 66 Swimmer of the Meet award.

Wening continued his triumph in the Paralympic Games in 2000 when he broke his own world record the same day. As co-captain of the team, he set a new world record during the 400-meter freestyle qualifying swim which he later beat to win a gold medal. His gold medal winning time was 4:42.97, beating his earlier record by three seconds. This also continued his streak as record holder to the 400-meter freestyle which he had held since 1991.

Career
After retiring from Para-athletics, Wening completed his Prosthetics and Orthotics training at Northwestern University. He joined Scheck and Siress as an orthotist and received the Orthotic and Prosthetic Education and Research Foundation's Small Grant Award for his paper Effects of Two Different AFOs on the Gait of Acute Hemiplegic CVA Subjects. In 2012, he was elected a Fellow of the American Academy of Orthotists and Prosthetists and later promoted to Scheck and Siress's laboratory manager. In 2018, Wening was named a shareholder of the company.

References

Living people
Sportspeople from Jefferson City, Missouri
Paralympic medalists in swimming
Swimmers at the 1992 Summer Paralympics
Swimmers at the 1996 Summer Paralympics
Swimmers at the 2000 Summer Paralympics
Paralympic bronze medalists for the United States
Paralympic gold medalists for the United States
Northwestern University alumni
University of Michigan alumni
Medalists at the 1992 Summer Paralympics
Medalists at the 1996 Summer Paralympics
Medalists at the 2000 Summer Paralympics
Paralympic swimmers of the United States
Year of birth missing (living people)
American male freestyle swimmers
American male medley swimmers
S8-classified Paralympic swimmers
Medalists at the World Para Swimming Championships
20th-century American people
21st-century American people